Sebastiano Santi (1788–1866) was an Italian painter, active both in oil and frescoes.

He was born in Murano and trained at the Academy of Fine Arts of Venice under Teodoro Matteini. His works are to be found in the Venetian churches. He painted the ceiling frescoes for the church of San Daniele, Padua.

References

1788 births
1866 deaths
People from Murano
18th-century Italian painters
Italian male painters
19th-century Italian painters
Painters from Venice
Accademia di Belle Arti di Venezia alumni
19th-century Italian male artists
18th-century Italian male artists